Biljana Pavićević may refer to:
 Biljana Pavićević (handballer) (born 1988), Montenegrin women's handball player
 Biljana Pavićević (basketballer) (born 1980), Montenegrin women's basketball player